Usechimorpha is a genus of ironclad beetles in the family Zopheridae. There are at least three described species in Usechimorpha.

Species
These three species belong to the genus Usechimorpha:
 Usechimorpha barberi Blaisdell, 1929
 Usechimorpha montana
 Usechimorpha montanus Doyen in Doyen & Lawrence, 1979

References

Further reading

 
 

Zopheridae
Articles created by Qbugbot